The Mercedes-Benz OM628 engine is a turbocharged V8 engine produced by Mercedes-Benz, from 1999 to 2005.

Design 
The OM628 was created in response to competing V8 diesel engines produced by Audi and BMW. It first appeared in the W220 S400 CDI and was subsequently the first V8 diesel engine in a Mercedes passenger vehicle. The OM628 engine features dual overhead camshafts, 4 valves per cylinder, exhaust gas recirculation, a Garrett GT1749V turbocharger, and Euro 4 emissions compliance. The engine block and cylinder heads are made from an aluminium alloy, via the sand-casting process.

Models

OM628 (184 kW version) 
 1999–2003 W220 S400 CDI
 2001–2005 W163 ML400 CDI
 2001–2005 W463 G400 CDI

OM628 (191 kW version) 
 2003–2005 W211 E400 CDI
 2003–2005 W220 S400 CDI

References 

OM628
Diesel engines by model
V8 engines